Lee Moon-kyu (born 4 August 1956) is a South Korean basketball player. He competed in the men's tournament at the 1988 Summer Olympics.

References

External links

1956 births
Living people
South Korean men's basketball players
1978 FIBA World Championship players
Olympic basketball players of South Korea
Basketball players at the 1988 Summer Olympics
Place of birth missing (living people)
South Korean expatriate sportspeople in China
Expatriate basketball people in China
South Korean basketball coaches
Asian Games medalists in basketball
Basketball players at the 1978 Asian Games
Basketball players at the 1986 Asian Games
Medalists at the 1978 Asian Games
Medalists at the 1986 Asian Games
Asian Games silver medalists for South Korea